This is a list of members of the Chamber of Deputies of Luxembourg during the 2018–2023 legislature.  The Chamber of Deputies is Luxembourg's national legislature, and consists of sixty deputies.  They are elected once every five years by the Hagenbach-Bischoff method (a variation on the D'Hondt method) from one of four of Luxembourg's constituencies. The members in this list were elected in the 2018 election. As in Luxembourg, voters vote for party lists, should a seat become vacant (through a resignation or death) there is no by-election. Instead the party nominates a new Deputy to fill the seat.

The government during this legislature was the Bettel–Schneider II Government, a coalition of the Democratic Party (DP), the Luxembourg Socialist Workers' Party (LSAP), and The Greens.

References

Members of the Chamber of Deputies
2018-2023